Juvisia (minor planet designation: 605 Juvisia) is a minor planet orbiting the Sun that was discovered 27 August 1906 in Heidelberg by German astronomer Max Wolf. It was named after the commune Juvisy-sur-Orge, France, where French astronomer Camille Flammarion had his observatory.

Photometric observations at the Palmer Divide Observatory in Colorado Springs, Colorado, in 1999 were used to build a light curve for this object. The asteroid displayed a rotation period of 15.93 ± 0.02 hours and a brightness variation of 0.25 ± 0.01 in magnitude.

References

External links
 Lightcurve plot of 605 Juvisia, Palmer Divide Observatory, B. D. Warner (1999)
 Asteroid Lightcurve Database (LCDB), query form (info )
 Dictionary of Minor Planet Names, Google books
 Asteroids and comets rotation curves, CdR – Observatoire de Genève, Raoul Behrend
 Discovery Circumstances: Numbered Minor Planets (1)-(5000) – Minor Planet Center
 
 

Background asteroids
Juvisia
Juvisia
19060827